Gypsy Love (German: Zigeunerliebe) is a 1922 Austrian silent film directed by Thomas E. Walsh and starring Anny Ondra and Albert von Kersten.

The film's sets were designed by the art director Artur Berger. It was shot at the Sievering Studios in Vienna. Karl Hartl worked as assistant director on the production.

Cast
 Anny Ondra
 Albert von Kersten
 Paul Baratoff as Ben Zwi 
 Julius Klinkowström
 Hugo Penyo
 Albertina Rasch
 Harry Schürmann
 Gyula Szöreghy

References

Bibliography
 Bock, Hans-Michael & Bergfelder, Tim. The Concise CineGraph. Encyclopedia of German Cinema. Berghahn Books, 2009.

External links

1922 films
Austrian silent feature films
Austrian black-and-white films
Films about Romani people
Films shot at Sievering Studios